MA-8 may refer to:

 
 Massachusetts Route 8
 Mercury-Atlas 8, a spaceflight of Project Mercury